Muhamed Džakmić (born 23 August 1985) is a Bosnian-Herzegovinian former football player and current football coach. He is currently working as an assistant manager at FK Sarajevo in the Premier League of Bosnia and Herzegovina.

Playing career

Club
He played as a midfielder for FK Sarajevo on two occasions and for Gangwon FC in the South Korean K League 1. With Sarajevo he won the national league in 2007 and the national cup in 2005 and 2014. He retired in 2014 while playing for Sarajevo at only the age of 29.

International
On December 10, 2010, he was given his national team debut in a friendly match against Poland. It remained his sole international appearance.

Coaching career
He started as a coach in 2016. He was an assistant coach to Almir Hurtić from March to August 2016, then an assistant at the Sarajevo U17 team. Since August 2017, he is the assistant coach of Husref Musemić in the first team of Sarajevo.

Career statistics

International

Honours

Player

Club
Sarajevo 
Bosnian Premier League: 2006–07
Bosnian Cup: 2004–05, 2013–14

References

External links

SportSport 

1985 births
Living people
Footballers from Sarajevo
Association football midfielders
Bosnia and Herzegovina footballers
Bosnia and Herzegovina international footballers
FK Sarajevo players
Gangwon FC players
Premier League of Bosnia and Herzegovina players
K League 1 players
Bosnia and Herzegovina expatriate footballers
Expatriate footballers in South Korea
Bosnia and Herzegovina expatriate sportspeople in South Korea